Lesław Kropp (22 November 1936 – 12 October 2013) was a Polish wrestler. He competed in the men's freestyle flyweight at the 1960 Summer Olympics.

References

1936 births
2013 deaths
Polish male sport wrestlers
Olympic wrestlers of Poland
Wrestlers at the 1960 Summer Olympics
People from Poddębice County
Sportspeople from Łódź Voivodeship